Leschenault's leaf-toed gecko (Hemidactylus leschenaultii) is a species of gecko, a lizard in the family Gekkonidae. The species is endemic to South Asia and parts of West Asia. It is often found inside homes. Its scientific name commemorates French botanist Jean Baptiste Leschenault de la Tour.

Description
H. leschenaultii has the following characters. Snout longer than the distance between the eye and the ear-opening, 1.33 to 1.40 times the diameter of the orbit; forehead concave, the supraorbital ridges prominent in full-grown specimens; ear-opening rather large, oval, vertical. Body and limbs moderate. A slight fold of the skin on the side of the belly, from axilla to groin. Digits free, strongly dilated, inner well developed; 6 or 7 (rarely 5) lamellae under the inner digits, 9 to 11 under the median. Head covered with minute granules posteriorly, with larger ones anteriorly; rostral four-sided, not twice as broad as deep, with median cleft above; nostril pierced between the rostral, three nasals, and generally the first labial; 10 to 12 upper and 8 or 9 lower labials; mental large, triangular or pentagonal; two pairs of chin-shields, the inner the larger and in contact behind the mental. Upper surface of body covered with small granules, uniform or intermixed with more or less numerous scattered round tubercles. Abdominal scales moderate, cycloid, imbricate. Male with a series of femoral pores interrupted on the preanal region; 12 to 16 pores on each side.   Tail depressed, flat below, covered above with small smooth scales and six longitudinal series of conical tubercles; beneath with a median series of transversely dilated plates.

Grey above, with darker markings, forming undulating cross-bars, rhomboidal spots on the middle of the back, or regular longitudinal bands; a dark band from the eye to the shoulder; lower surfaces white.

From snout to vent ; tail .

Geographic range
H. leshenaultii is found in southern India, Sri Lanka, Pakistan, and Oman.

Type locality: Ceylon.

References

Further reading
Blanford WT (1870). "Notes on some Reptilia and Amphibia from Central India". J. Asiatic Soc. Bengal 39 (2): 335-376. (Hemidactylus marmoratus, new species, p. 363).
Boulenger GA (1885). Catalogue of the Lizards in the British Museum (Natural History). Second Edition. Volume I. Geckonidæ ... London: Trustees of the British Museum (Natural History). (Taylor and Francis, printers). xii + 436 pp. + Plates I-XXXII. (Hemidactylus leschenaultii, pp. 136–137).
Das I (2002). A Photographic Guide to Snakes and other Reptiles of India. Sanibel Island, Florida: Ralph Curtis Books. 144 pp. . (Hemidactylus leschenaultii, p. 99).
Duméril AMC, Bibron G (1836). Erpétologie Générale ou Histoire Naturelle Complète des Reptiles, Tome troisième [Volume 3]. Paris: Librairie Encyclopédique de Roret. iv + 517 pp. (Hemidactylus leschenaultii, new species, pp. 364–365). (in French).
Gray JE (1845). Catalogue of the Specimens of Lizards in the Collection of the British Museum. London: Trustees of the British Museum. (Edward Newman, printer). xxviii + 289 pp. (Hemidactylus leschenaultii, p. 155).
Günther ACLG (1864). The Reptiles of British India. London: The Ray Society. (Taylor and Francis, printers). xxvii + 452 pp. + Plates I-XXVI. (Hemidactylus leschenaultii, p. 109).
Scheuerer, Hans (1985). "Hemidactylus leschenaultii Dumèril & Bibron, 1836, ein Gecko aus Sri Lanka ". Sauria 7 (3): 29-30. (in German).
Smith MA (1935). The Fauna of British India, Including Ceylon and Burma. Reptilia and Amphibia. Vol. II.—Sauria. London: Secretary of State for India in Council. (Taylor and Francis, printers). xiii + 440 pp. + Plate I + 2 maps. ("Hemidactylus leschenaulti [sic]", pp. 97–98).

External links

Hemidactylus
Reptiles of Pakistan
Reptiles described in 1836
Taxa named by André Marie Constant Duméril
Taxa named by Gabriel Bibron